Elder Vogel, Jr. (born July 9, 1956) is a Republican member of the Pennsylvania State Senate. He has represented the 47th district since 2009.

Professional career

Vogel is a fourth generation dairy farmer who operates his family's farm in New Sewickley Township.

Political career

Prior to joining the Senate, Vogel served as a New Sewickley Township supervisor.

On November 4, 2008, he was elected to the State Senate, succeeding retiring Democrat Gerald LaValle. Vogel defeated his opponent, Jason Petrella, by a margin of 56.8% to 43.2%. His original opponent, State Representative Sean Ramaley, dropped out of the race due to alleged involvement in the bonusgate scandal.

Vogel currently serves as Chairman of the Agriculture and Rural Affairs Committee, Vice-Chairman of the Senate Local Government Committee, and also sits on the Appropriations, Environmental Resources & Energy, Public Health & Welfare, and Urban Affairs & Housing Committees.

References

External links
State Senator Elder Vogel official PA Senate website
 official campaign website

Republican Party Pennsylvania state senators
1956 births
Living people
21st-century American politicians
People from Rochester, Pennsylvania